La Bella Mafia is the third studio album by American rapper Lil' Kim, released on March 4, 2003, by Atlantic Records. The album debuted at number five on the US Billboard 200, was certified platinum by the Recording Industry Association of America (RIAA) for selling one million copies in the United States.

La Bella Mafia received positive reviews from music critics, marking Kim's lyrical ability as impressive and her presence as formidable. It produced two singles that attained Billboard chart success. The lead single "The Jump Off" peaked at number 17 on the US Billboard Hot 100 and at number 16 on the UK Singles Chart. The second single "Magic Stick", featured 50 Cent, peaked at number two on the Billboard Hot 100. The singles "Magic Stick" and "Came Back for You" earned Kim Grammy Award nominations for Best Rap Performance by a Duo or Group and Best Female Rap Solo Performance, respectively.

Background
In late 2001, Lil' Kim left Junior M.A.F.I.A. and severed ties with all members. She also ended her friendship and business relationship with longtime collaborator Sean "Diddy" Combs.

Recording sessions for La Bella Mafia began in the spring of 2002. In April 2002, Lil' Kim stated in an interview that she had begun working with Dr. Dre in the recording studio. She told MTV, "I've been talking to Dre a lot. And Dre and I are talking about possibly doing some collaborations. He's a cool cat. I love Dre. Our chemistry in the studio was just like, cool. We've been working, you know, trying to cook up some things". Kim also stated that she wanted to work with Eminem, Timbaland, and The Neptunes.

The original title for the album was Hollyhood (which was also set to be the name of her clothing line and to her skit), but it was changed to La Bella Mafia (which in Italian means "The Beautiful Mafia") after Lil' Kim watched the 1997 film of the same name. She stated, "Any girl who's strong and very dedicated to what they do and don't take no mess, they can be a part of La Bella Mafia".

Limited edition collectable cards were included in the first 500,000 US CDs that allowed fans to unlock exclusive content, such as photos and video, from the Internet.

Singles
Altogether La Bella Mafia spawned two international singles and a third US-only single. The lead album's first single, "The Jump Off" peaked at number 17 on the US Billboard Hot 100, becoming Kim's biggest single since her 1997's "Not Tonight (Ladies Night Remix)". It also reached number eight on the Hot R&B/Hip-Hop Songs chart, number seven on the Hot Rap Tracks chart, and number 16 on the UK Singles Chart. The second single, "Magic Stick", featuring 50 Cent, reached number two on the Hot 100, without a music video, and it was not even released as a single. It ended up spending 14 weeks on the chart, becoming Kim's highest-peaking single on that chart. It also reached number two on the Hot R&B/Hip-Hop Songs chart, number seven on the Pop chart and number one on the Hot Rap Songs chart. The song "Thug Luv", featuring Twista, was serviced to US radios only. It reached number 60 on the Hot R&B/Hip-Hop Songs chart and number 14 on the Hot Rap Songs. A CD single was also released in the US.

Critical reception

La Bella Mafia received generally positive reviews, as Metacritic reviews scored it at 65 out of 100. AllMusic critic Jason Birchmeier stated her previous album The Notorious K.I.M. was considered a "disappointment" as a follow-up to her debut album Hard Core and La Bella Mafia reestablished her as an "industry icon". Nick Catucci, a critic for Spin Magazine, who gave the album 3 stars claimed, "The King is dead – long live the Queen".

Stylus magazine critic Brett Berliner gave the album a B+ calling the album "one of the top hip-hop albums of 2003" and said, "Kim is now in a class of female MCs that includes only Rah Digga and MC Lyte – and she's more confident, funny, and sexy than any of them". Sal Cinquemani of Slant Magazine gave the album 3 stars stating the album was her "most consistent effort to date," and added the album "plays like one giant bravado about everything: fame, money, power, sex, clothes, rhymes".

Critics were also impressed with her lyrical ability. Jon Caramanica of Rolling Stone gave the album 3 stars stating, "When she really gets her hands dirty, Kim sounds more forceful and engaged than she's been in years". However, some critics felt the album was too long and contained too many fillers. Birchmeier of AllMusic stated the album could use a little "trimming". Brett Berliner of Stylus Magazine said, "I enjoy about eight songs on this album, but they're tracks I only feel like listening to from time to time".

Commercial performance
La Bella Mafia debuted at number five on the US Billboard 200 and at number four on the Top R&B/Hip-Hop Albums chart, selling 166,000 copies in its first week. On October 16, 2003, the album received a Platinum certification by the Recording Industry Association of America (RIAA), and had sold 1.1 million copies in the United States by July 2005. Intertionally, the album reached number 81 in Switzerland, number 82 in Germany, and number 105 in France. La Bella Mafia had sold over 1 million copies worldwide as of October 2007.

Track listing

Notes
  signifies a co-producer.

Sample credits
 "Intro" contains a sample of "Juicy" by The Notorious B.I.G.
 "Hold It Now" contains a sample of "Paul Revere" by Beastie Boys.
 "Can't Fuck with Queen Bee" contains an interpolation of "Free" by Deniece Williams.
 "Shake Ya Bum Bum" contains a sample of "Hum" by Sudesh Bhosle, Mohammad Aziz, Udit Narayan, Alka Yagnik, and Sonali Vajpayee.
 "The Jump Off" contains an interpolation of "Jeeps, Lex Coups, Bimaz & Benz" by Lost Boyz.
 "This Is a Warning" contains a sample of "A Woman's Threat" by R. Kelly.
 "Magic Stick" contains elements of "The Thrill Is Gone" by B.B. King.
 "Get in Touch with Us" contains a sample of "Zindagi Ban Gaye Ho Tum" by Udit Narayan and Alka Yagnik.
 "Heavenly Father" contains a sample of "A Prayer" by The O'Jays.
 "Came Back for You" contains a sample of "Didn't We" by Irene Reid.

Personnel

Kimberly "Lil' Kim" Jones – executive producer, styling
Hillary Weston – associate producer, management
Jean Nelson – associate producer
Jamel "Mann" Jackson – project manager
Joi Brown – project manager
Greg "Gee" Stewart – assistant engineer
L. Londell McMillan, P.C. – legal affairs
David Berdon LLP & Co. – business affairs
DJ 45 – album sequencing
Dan "The" Man – album sequencing
Vincent Soyez – photography, design
Tre Major – hair
JJ – makeup
Derek Lee – styling
Linda Keil – prop stylist
MiMi So – jewelry
David LaChapelle – photography
Cessy Lima – hair
Scott Barnes – makeup
Andrea Leiberman – styling
Diamond Quasar – jewelry
Lynn Kowalewski – art direction
Kevin Wolahan – design

Charts

Weekly charts

Year-end charts

Certifications

References

2003 albums
Albums produced by Full Force
Albums produced by Havoc (musician)
Albums produced by Kanye West
Albums produced by Ron Browz
Albums produced by Scott Storch
Albums produced by Swizz Beatz
Albums produced by Timbaland
Atlantic Records albums
International Rock Star Records albums
Lil' Kim albums